İşte Benim Stilim (previously aired as Bu Tarz Benim) is a reality competition show in Turkey.

The show is hosted by Öykü Serter. The jury members on this show are Nur Yerlitaş, Ivana Sert, Kemal Doğulu, Uğurkan Erez, and Kerimcan Durmaz. The influential fashion designer Nur Yerlitaş later decided to withdraw from the seventh season of the show due to her illness.

Show format 
Female contestants, compete each week in front of a judge to get points on their style. The contestants have to come up with a different outfit, each day from Monday to Friday to get the fashion star. On the final day of the week, called "Gala Gecesi", they have to dress, according to a fixed theme to win a prize and style points. By the end of the day, a total of points is presented, and the contestant with the lowest score gets eliminated.

Other similar versions of the show format are produced in other countries as well, such as the show My Style Rocks in Greece on ΣΚΑΪ and "Bravo, ai Stil!" (Romanian: Great, you've got the style!) through the TV formats Turkish production company Global Agency, on the Turkish-owned Television channel Kanal D Romania, where the prizes for the "Final Gala" are among 100,000 lei (equivalent of €22,000) and a television career for the 1st-place winner, and a brand new car for the second-place winner. In this show also in the weekly eliminatory galas, each contestant who ranks low among the juries and or being nominated by their rival contestants for elimination, one of the two contestants who rank the lowest among public votes will have to exit the contest. This version of the show, includes Televoting (around €1.25 SMS VAT tax included) to vote for their favourite, another jury who can choose to give or to take one's contestant achieved star at the end of the show during Monday through Friday, and at the eliminatory or non-eliminatory galas every Saturday, a group of three well-known male celebrities will appreciate with a "like" or "dislike" their appearance on the stage and also give a bonus of three points for their decided favourite appearance. This show is very popular among Romanians in and out of the country and is the most-viewed Romanian TV programme on YouTube.

Season 1

Contestants

Season 2

Contestants

Season 3

Contestants

Season 4 (All Stars)

Contestants

Season 5 (Celebrities)

Contestants

Season 6

Contestants

Season 7

Contestants

References

Turkish reality television series